Espionage is the obtaining of information considered secret or confidential without the permission of the holder of the information.

 Industrial espionage is a form of espionage conducted for commercial purposes instead of purely national security.

Espionage may also refer to:

Espionage (play), a 1935 West End play by Walter Hackett
Espionage (1937 film), an American film based on the play
Espionage (1955 film), an Austrian film directed by Franz Antel
Espionage (TV series), a British television show 
Espionage (production team), a Norwegian music production team
Espionage (album), an album by rap group Steady Mobb'n
Espionage (band), a band from the 1980s
"Espionage", a song by Green Day from Shenanigans
Espionage, a Commodore 64 game